Bhaji or Bhajji may refer to:

Bhaji, an Indian version of vegetable fritters
Baji (food), a type of beaten rice eaten in Nepal
Amaranth, or Bhaji in Trinidad and Tobago, a cosmopolitan genus of herbs
Harbhajan Singh, an Indian cricketer
For "crewman of a working barge" see bargee or wikt:bargee